Steven Robert Olin (October 4, 1965 – March 22, 1993) was an American right-handed pitcher in Major League Baseball who played for four seasons in the American League with the Cleveland Indians. Olin was a right-handed submarining relief pitcher for the Cleveland Indians from 1988 to 1992. Olin died in a 1993 boating accident while still an active MLB player.

Early life
Steve Olin was born on October 4, 1965, in Portland, Oregon, and grew up in nearby Beaverton. He graduated from Beaverton High School in 1984, and was recruited by baseball coach Jack Dunn to attend Portland State University. Olin set a Pac-10 Conference record with 31 career complete games at Portland State between 1984 and 1987.

Career
In 195 career games, Olin pitched 273 innings and posted a win–loss record of 16–19, with 48 saves, 118 games finished, and a 3.10 earned run average (ERA). He earned his final win on September 9, 1992, against the Milwaukee Brewers. Olin won the game in relief when Cleveland scored two runs in the top of the ninth.

Death
During spring training before the 1993 season, Olin was killed in a boating accident on Little Lake Nellie in Clermont, Florida. The boat he was in struck a pier, killing him and fellow reliever Tim Crews and seriously injuring Bob Ojeda. Crews, who was piloting the boat, had a blood alcohol level of 0.14 at the time of the accident; Olin and Ojeda had negligible traces of alcohol in their blood. Olin and Crews were the first active major league players to die since Thurman Munson in 1979. In their memory, the Cleveland Indians wore a patch on their jerseys featuring both players' uniform numbers during the 1993 season.

Remembrance
The Beatles song "Yellow Submarine" was played before each of submariner Olin's appearances for the Indians in home games.

One of Olin's favorite songs, "The Dance" by Garth Brooks, was played over the stadium speakers when the Indians clinched the 1995 American League Central Division. Before the game, manager Mike Hargrove had phoned the Indians scoreboard room requesting that the song be played that night.

See also
List of baseball players who died during their careers

References

External links

Little Lake Nellie: A Decade Later

1965 births
1993 deaths
Cleveland Indians players
Major League Baseball pitchers
Baseball players from Oregon
Portland State Vikings baseball players
Accidental deaths in Florida
Alcohol-related deaths in Florida
Burlington Indians players (1986–2006)
Kinston Indians players
Waterloo Indians players
Colorado Springs Sky Sox players
Beaverton High School alumni
Boating accident deaths